Chicken Switch is a Melvins remix album by various noise and experimental artists, released on September 29, 2009. Unlike usual remix albums where the remixer is given a single track to work with, for Chicken Switch each remixer was given a full album to work with and pull from to create their track (and in some cases, more than one full album was used as source material). The song names were also newly selected by their remixer.

Track listing 
 Washmachine Sk8tronics - Eye Yamatsuka
 Emperor Twaddle Reemix - Christoph Heemann
 She Chokes Her Dying Breath and Does It In my Face - V/Vm
 AAHHH... - John Duncan
 Linkshänder - Matmos
 EggNog Trilogy i) She's Ivanhoe ii) Cancer iii) Inebriated - Lee Ranaldo
 SNOW REM REM IBVZ - Merzbow
 Prick Concrete/Revolution M - David Scott Stone
 Queen (Electroclash Remix) - The Panacea
 The Silky Apple Butter of Youth - Sunroof!
 4th Floor Hellcopter - Kawabata Makoto
 disp_tx_skel_mach_murx - Farmers Manual
 Overgoat - Void Manes
 Over from Under the Dog, Girl & Boy Treatment - RLW
 Hard Revenge Milly Bloody Battle VS. The Melvins Ozmatized Gore Police (Feat. Cardopusher of the Five Deadly Venoms) - Speedranch
 Punch the Limo - Hiro Noodles (mp3 bonus track)

Album(s) chosen for Remixes 
 Washmachine Sk8tronics - Hostile Ambient Takeover
 Emperor Twaddle Reemix - Honky
 She Chokes Her Dying Breath and Does It In my Face - 26 Songs
 AAHHH... - Lysol, The Bootlicker
 Linkshänder - Gluey Porch Treatments
 EggNog Trilogy i) She's Ivanhoe ii) Cancer iii) Inebriated - Eggnog
 SNOW REM REM IBVZ - Stag
 Prick Concrete/Revolution M - Prick
 Queen (Electroclash Remix) - Stoner Witch
 The Silky Apple Butter of Youth - Ozma
 4th Floor Hellcopter - Bullhead
 disp_tx_skel_mach_murx - Gluey Porch Treatments
 Overgoat - Houdini, Prick, Stag, Ozma, Hostile Ambient Takeover
 Over from Under the Dog, Girl & Boy Treatment - Gluey Porch Treatments
 Hard Revenge Milly Bloody Battle VS. The Melvins Ozmatized Gore Police (Feat. Cardopusher of the Five Deadly Venoms) - Ozma
 Punch the Limo (Mp3 Only) - King Buzzo EP, Hostile Ambient Takeover, and other albums

References 

Melvins compilation albums
2009 remix albums
2009 compilation albums
Grunge remix albums
Ipecac Recordings compilation albums
Ipecac Recordings remix albums